Siete is the Spanish word for seven. It may refer to:

Sie7e (born 1977), a Puerto Rican singer
Sietes (born 1974), a Spanish footballer
El Sie7e, a Colombian band
LaSiete, a Spanish television channel that aired from 2008-2014
Siete (album), a 2003 album by Carlos Varela
Siete, an album by Presuntos Implicados
El Siete, a promotional name for the TV network Azteca 7
Sie7e +, a 2018 album by Danna Paola

See also